Søldarfjørður is a village in the south of the Faroese island of Eysturoy in Runavík Municipality.

The 2002 population was 344. Its postal code is FO 344.

References

External links
Personal Danish site with photographs of Søldarfjørður

See also
 List of towns in the Faroe Islands

Populated places in the Faroe Islands
Eysturoy